União da Madeira competed in the 2013–14 Segunda Liga, the 2013–14 Taça da Liga, and the 2013-14 Taça de Portugal.

Roster

Match results

Segunda Liga

Taça da Liga
Group A

Taça de Portugal

Sources

Uniao da Madeira
C.F. União